Sandra Hollins is an American politician serving as a member of the Utah State House of Representatives and represents House District 23. Hollins is the first African-American woman to serve in the Utah State Legislature.

Early life and education 
A native of Louisiana, Hollins is a graduate of McDonogh 35 College Preparatory Charter High School in New Orleans. She received a Bachelor of Science degree in business management from the University of Phoenix and a Masters in Social Work from the University of Utah.

Career 
Hollins has served as a member of the Utah House of Representatives since 2015. She ran for office in 2014 and defeated Republican candidate Kristopher Smith. Hollis serves as vice chair of the House Ethics Committee.

References

External links
 Official Page
 Biography Project Vote Smart
 Sandra Hollins at Ballotpedia

Living people
Women state legislators in Utah
Democratic Party members of the Utah House of Representatives
University of Utah alumni
African-American state legislators in Utah
21st-century American politicians
21st-century American women politicians
Politicians from Salt Lake City
Year of birth missing (living people)
21st-century African-American women
21st-century African-American politicians